Noble Foods is a British poultry company. As of 2016, it was the UK's largest egg producer. 

The company was founded in 2006 through the merger of Deans Foods and Stonegate. The company subsequently had to divest itself of its Stonegate business after the Competition Commission found that it violated UK antitrust laws. 

In 2017 and 2018 The Humane League petitioned Noble Foods over its farming practices, which used caged hens for its Big & Fresh brand, and Animal Equality released footage of treatment of hens in Noble Foods' supply chain. Soon after, in March 2018, Noble Foods announced a pledge to go completely cage-free by 2025. Since 2019, they have achieved top tier ranking in the Business Benchmark on Farm Animal Welfare.

References

2006 establishments in England
Companies based in Oxfordshire
Food and drink companies of England
British companies established in 2006
Food and drink companies established in 2006